The Malesanden and Huse Wildlife Sanctuary is located on the east side of Harøya island in the municipality of Ålesund in Møre og Romsdal county, Norway.

The area received protection in 1988 "to preserve an important wetland area with its habitat, bird life and other wildlife," according to the conservation regulations. The area consists of a low, wide sandy beach that is a nesting, resting, and overwintering site for various birds: waders, the common shelduck, and the greylag goose. Waterfowl and seabirds overwinter to such an extent that it is considered to have national or even international importance. The dunes also have botanical interest, especially the dune heath, which is one of three intact ones in the county.

The Malesanden and Huse Wildlife Sanctuary is a  buffer zone with two subareas covering : the Malesanden Bird Sanctuary and the Huse Bird Sanctuary.

The wildlife sanctuary is one of six natural areas that were included in the Harøya Wetlands System Ramsar site, which was established in 1996.

References

External links
 Mijlø-direktoratet: Malesanden og Huse. Map and description of the nature reserve.
 Miljøverndepartementet. 1987. Malesanden og Huse dyrefredningsområde med tilgrendande dyrelivsfreding, Sandøy kommune, Møre og Romsdal fylke. 1:20,000 map of the wildlife sanctuary.
 Forskrift om vern av Malesanden og Huse fuglefredingsområde med tilgrensande dyrelivsfreding, Sandøy kommune, Møre og Romsdal. 1988.

Nature reserves in Norway
Ramsar sites in Norway
Protected areas of Møre og Romsdal
Ålesund
Protected areas established in 1988